A sister ship is a ship of the same class or of virtually identical design to another ship. Such vessels share a nearly identical hull and superstructure layout, similar size, and roughly comparable features and equipment.  They often share a common naming theme, either being named after the same type of thing or person (places, constellations, heads of state) or with some kind of alliteration. Typically the ship class is named for the first ship of that class. Often, sisters become more differentiated during their service as their equipment (in the case of naval vessels, their armament) are separately altered.

As with some other liners, the sisters worked as running mates.

Half-sister refers to a ship of the same class but with some significant differences. One example of half-sisters are the First World War-era British s where the first two ships had four  guns, but the last ship, had two  guns instead. All three were converted into aircraft carriers, with Furious again differing from her half-sisters by initially being flush-decked and later by having a much smaller island. Another example is the American s of the Second World War that came in "long-hull" and "short-hull" versions.

The generally accepted commercial distinctions of a "sister ship" are the following:
 Type: Identical main type (bulk, tank, RoRo, etc.)
 Dry weight (DWT): ± 10% on the DWT (If the ship is 100,000 DWT, 90,000 to 110,000 DWT)
 Builder: Identical shipbuilding company name (not the ship yard location or the country of build)

The critical overriding criterion is having the same hull design. For example, the popular TESS-57 standard design built by Tsunishi Shipbuilding are built in Japan, China, and the Philippines. All the ships of this design are classed as sister ships.

The International Maritime Organization defined sister ship in IMO resolution MSC/Circ.1158 in 2006. Criteria included these:
 A sister ship is a ship built by the same yard from the same plans.
 The acceptable deviation of lightship displacement should be between 1 and 2% of the lightship displacement of the lead ship, depending on the length of the ship.

See also 
 Ship naming and launching
 Ship commissioning

References

Ships
Ship classes